Boundary-Similkameen is a provincial riding formed in 2008. It includes the populations of Penticton-Okanagan Valley, West Kootenay-Boundary and Yale-Lillooet.  The riding's name corresponds to that of a former riding in the same area, with similar but not identical boundaries (see History section).

Geography
As of the 2020 provincial election, Boundary-Similkameen comprises the western portion of the Regional District of Kootenay Boundary and the Regional District of Okanagan-Similkameen, minus the northeastern portion which is part of the Penticton Electoral District. It is located in southern British Columbia and is bordered by Washington, United States to the south. Communities in the electoral district consist of Osoyoos, Oliver, Grand Forks, Princeton, and Keremeos.

Member of Legislative Assembly 
Due to the realignment of electoral boundaries, most incumbents did not represent the entirety of their listed district during the preceding legislative term. Bill Barisoff, British Columbia Liberal Party was initially elected during the 2005 election and 2001 election to the Penticton-Okanagan Valley riding, where the bulk of the new riding's population resides.  Katrine Conroy, NDP. was the MLA for West Kootenay-Boundary, while Harry Lali, NDP, was the MLA for Yale-Lillooet (the areas of those ridings added to Boundary-Similkameen are less-populated and were not main population centres in their ridings).

History
The original riding of Boundary-Similkameen was a provincial electoral district in the Canadian province of British Columbia. It spanned the Boundary Country, around the towns of Grand Forks and Rock Creek west including Oliver and Osoyoos to the Similkameen Valley towns of Keremeos and Princeton.  The riding first appeared in the 1966 election as the result of a merger of the former ridings of Grand Forks-Greenwood (1924–1963) and Similkameen. Until the re-creation of Boundary-Similkameen, the former area was part of West Kootenay-Boundary; areas in the Similkameen had been part of Yale-Lillooet (which has been reconstituted as Fraser-Nicola).

For other historical and current ridings in the region, see Kootenay (electoral districts) and Okanagan (electoral districts).

Demographics

Electoral history 

|align="right"|$99,832
 
|NDP
|Lakhvinder Jhaj
|align="right"|5,870
|align="right"|32.91%
|align="right"|-7.89
|align="right"|$52,629
|-

|}

|- bgcolor="white"
!align="right" colspan=3|Total valid votes
!align="right"|29,868
!align="right"|100.00%
!align="right"|
|- bgcolor="white"
!align="right" colspan=3|Total rejected ballots
!align="right"|218
!align="right"|
!align="right"|
|- bgcolor="white"
!align="right" colspan=3|Turnout
!align="right"|%
!align="right"|
!align="right"|
|- bgcolor="white"
!align="right" colspan=7|2  Seat increased to two members from one.
|}

The 1988 byelection, which elected NDP member Bill Barlee, was the last appearance of the Boundary-Similkameen riding until its recreation in 2009.  For the 1991 election, the area became represented by Okanagan-Boundary.

|- bgcolor="white"
!align="right" colspan=3|Total valid votes
!align="right"|60,693 
!align="right"|100.00%
!align="right"|
|- bgcolor="white"
!align="right" colspan=3|Total rejected ballots
!align="right"|758
!align="right"|
!align="right"|
|- bgcolor="white"
!align="right" colspan=3|Turnout
!align="right"|%
!align="right"|
!align="right"|
|- bgcolor="white"
!align="right" colspan=7|2  Seat increased to two members from one.
|}

|- bgcolor="white"
!align="right" colspan=3|Total valid votes
!align="right"|34,423 		 
!align="right"|100.00%
!align="right"|
|- bgcolor="white"
!align="right" colspan=3|Total rejected ballots
!align="right"|312
!align="right"|
!align="right"|
|- bgcolor="white"
!align="right" colspan=3|Turnout
!align="right"|%
!align="right"|
!align="right"|
|}

 
|Progressive Conservative
|John Edwin Swales
|align="right"|3,662 	 	 		
|align="right"|12.68%
|align="right"|
|align="right"|unknown
|- bgcolor="white"
!align="right" colspan=3|Total valid votes
!align="right"|28,886 	
!align="right"|100.00%
!align="right"|
|- bgcolor="white"
!align="right" colspan=3|Total rejected ballots
!align="right"|324
!align="right"|
!align="right"|
|- bgcolor="white"
!align="right" colspan=3|Turnout
!align="right"|%
!align="right"|
!align="right"|
|}

 
|Progressive Conservative
|Barry Donald Montgomery
|align="right"|1,778 		 		
|align="right"|7.96%
|align="right"|
|align="right"|unknown

|- bgcolor="white"
!align="right" colspan=3|Total valid votes
!align="right"|22,325
!align="right"|100.00%
!align="right"|
|- bgcolor="white"
!align="right" colspan=3|Total rejected ballots
!align="right"|161
!align="right"|
!align="right"|
|- bgcolor="white"
!align="right" colspan=3|Turnout
!align="right"|%
!align="right"|
!align="right"|
|}

 
|Progressive Conservative
|Donald James Ewart
|align="right"|1,550 	
|align="right"|8.45%
|align="right"|
|align="right"|unknown
|- bgcolor="white"
!align="right" colspan=3|Total valid votes
!align="right"|18,347
!align="right"|100.00%
!align="right"|
|- bgcolor="white"
!align="right" colspan=3|Total rejected ballots
!align="right"|122
!align="right"|
!align="right"|
|- bgcolor="white"
!align="right" colspan=3|Turnout
!align="right"|%
!align="right"|
!align="right"|
|}

|- bgcolor="white"
!align="right" colspan=3|Total valid votes
!align="right"|16,476
!align="right"|100.00%
!align="right"|
|- bgcolor="white"
!align="right" colspan=3|Total rejected ballots
!align="right"|122
!align="right"|
!align="right"|
|- bgcolor="white"
!align="right" colspan=3|Turnout
!align="right"|%
!align="right"|
!align="right"|
|}

|- bgcolor="white"
!align="right" colspan=3|Total valid votes
!align="right"|11,810
!align="right"|100.00%
!align="right"|
|- bgcolor="white"
!align="right" colspan=3|Total rejected ballots
!align="right"|87
!align="right"|
!align="right"|
|- bgcolor="white"
!align="right" colspan=3|Turnout
!align="right"|%
!align="right"|
!align="right"|
|}

References 

Elections BC Historical Returns

British Columbia provincial electoral districts